Goulburn Valley Grammar School (or GVGS) is an independent, co-educational school in Victoria situated on a 17 hectare rural site 6 km north of the centre of Shepparton, approximately 190 km north of Melbourne. Students from across Victoria and southern New South Wales attend, with students from Benalla, Seymour, Cobram, Numurkah, Yarrawonga, Tocumwal, Moama, Echuca and Nagambie all undertaking the daily bus trip. The school's mascot is the pelican, and the motto is Semper Ulterius, which can be translated from Latin to 'Always further', suggesting there is always something more to know or experience. The school was founded in 1982 by Vic Ryall. It has students from Years 5–12.

In 2008 a new principal was appointed, Mark Torriero. He succeeded Ian Rule, who had been in the position of Principal since 1998.

The school's mascot is the pelican. This was appointed to GVGS by late principal David Prest simply because pelicans were a common sight among the school grounds. The lake and wetlands on campus provided an ideal habitat for the animals.

Houses 
The school has four houses Dunlop, Fairley, McLennan and Ryall. The houses were names after Edward "Weary" Dunlop, Sir Andrew Fairley (AM), Ian McLennan and founding principal Vic Ryall. The house colours are Blue for Dunlop, Red for Fairley, Green for McLennan and Yellow for Ryall. Students from these houses complete annually in the school Swimming, Athletics, Cross-Country, and Eisteddfod Competitions.

Principals

Notable alumni

Media
Xavier Di Petta - Entrepreneur (Class of 2014)

Sportspeople 
Ollie Wines - (AFL - Brownlow Medal 2021)(Class of 2012)
Clayton Oliver - (AFL) (Class of 2015)
Josh Schache – (AFL) (Class of 2015)
Alex Keath -(AFL, Cricketer)
Luke Lowden -(AFL)
Jordon Butts -(AFL) (Class of 2018)

Academic results

2007 Academic results 

31% of students gained a score of over 90 on the Equivalent National Tertiary Entrance Rank (ENTER), with 18% scoring over 95. Four students scored over 99 and 57% of students received an ENTER of above 80 placing them in the top 20% of the state.  The median score was 81.40.

2010 Academic results 

More than half the students (53%) achieved a score of over 80 on the Australian Tertiary Admission Rank
(ATAR), with 17% of students achieved a score of over 90 and 12% scoring over 95. Four Goulburn Valley Grammar School students achieved ATAR scores in excess of 99.

Summary of results:
 81% of all students achieved an ATAR of 60+, placing them in the top 40% of the State
 66% of all students achieved an ATAR of 70+, placing them in the top 30% of the State
 53% of all students achieved an ATAR of 80+, placing them in the top 20% of the State
 17% of all students achieved an ATAR of 90+, placing them in the top 10% of the State
 12% of all students achieved an ATAR of 95+, placing them in the top 5% of the State
 4 students achieved ATAR scores of 99 or above
 3 perfect study scores of 50 were achieved
 81 was the Median ATAR score
 34 was the Median study score
 17.6% of all study scores were 40 or more

2011 Academic results 

Rank (ATAR) placing them in the top 30% of the State. A quarter of students (25%) achieved a score over 90 which placed them in the top 10% of the State. 10% of students achieved a score over 95 placing them in the top 5% of the State.
In 2011 three students achieved an ATAR score over 99 placing them in the top 1% of the State, with James O'Callaghan scoring a perfect score of 99.95.

 3 Students achieved ATAR scores of 99 or above
 3 perfect study scores of 50 were achieved
 78 was the Median ATAR score
 33 was the Median study score
 14% of all study scores were 40 or more
 94 students completed year 12 and applied for an ATAR score

2015 Academic results

A total of 98 students completed VCE in 2015 to receive an ATAR. Of these 98, 79 (81%) received an ATAR of over 70, placing them in the top 30% of the state. In total, two students (across three subjects) scored a perfect study score of 50, and five students scored an ATAR of 99 or above, placing them in the top 1% of the state. Henry Fox achieved a score of 99.75, resulting in him receiving the 2015 Dux.

Summary of results:
 81% of all students achieved an ATAR of 70+, placing them in the top 30% of the State
 62% of all students achieved an ATAR of 80+, placing them in the top 20% of the State
 26% of all students achieved an ATAR of 90+, placing them in the top 10% of the State
 17% of all students achieved an ATAR of 95+, placing them in the top 5% of the State
 9% of all students achieved an ATAR of 98+, placing them in the top 2% of the State
 21% of study scores were 40+
 83.45 was the median ATAR score
 35 was the median study score

2016 Academic results

A total of 100 students completed VCE in 2015 to receive an ATAR. Of these 100, 78 received an ATAR score above 70, placing them in the top 30% of results Statewide. There were six perfect study-scores of 50, and two ATAR scores of above 99. The dux of 2016 was Janna Lawson with an ATAR of 99.50. GVGS gained a statewide school ranking of #32.

Summary of results:
 78% of all students achieved an ATAR of 70+, placing them in the top 30% of the State
 63% of all students achieved an ATAR of 80+, placing them in the top 20% of the State
 37% of all students achieved an ATAR of 90+, placing them in the top 10% of the State
 22% of all students achieved an ATAR of 95+, placing them in the top 5% of the State
 6% of all students achieved an ATAR of 98+, placing them in the top 2% of the State
 23% of study scores were 40+
 85.20 was the median ATAR score
 35 was the median study score

2017 Academic results

A total of 91 students received an ATAR score in 2017. Of these 91, the dux was Mitchell Collins with an ATAR of 99.40.

Summary of results:
 75% of all students achieved an ATAR of 70+, placing them in the top 30% of the State
 53% of all students achieved an ATAR of 80+, placing them in the top 20% of the State
 25% of all students achieved an ATAR of 90+, placing them in the top 10% of the State
 13% of all students achieved an ATAR of 95+, placing them in the top 5% of the State
 7% of all students achieved an ATAR of 98+, placing them in the top 2% of the State
 17% of study scores were 40+
 81.35 was the median ATAR score
 34 was the median study score

2018 Academic results

The 2018 dux was Aditya Ryan Bhat with an ATAR of 99.99.

Summary of results:
 72% of all students achieved an ATAR of 70+, placing them in the top 30% of the State
 51% of all students achieved an ATAR of 80+, placing them in the top 20% of the State
 29% of all students achieved an ATAR of 90+, placing them in the top 10% of the State
 19% of all students achieved an ATAR of 95+, placing them in the top 5% of the State
 4 students achieved an ATAR of 99+, placing them in the top 2% of the State
 4 students acheived a perfect study score of 50
 81.15 was the median ATAR score
 34 was the median study score

2022 Academic results

The dux of 2022 was Anna Howell with an ATAR of 99.75.

Summary of results:
 75% of all students achieved an ATAR of 70+, placing them in the top 30% of the State
 55% of all students achieved an ATAR of 80+, placing them in the top 20% of the State
 33% of all students achieved an ATAR of 90+, placing them in the top 10% of the State
 15% of all students achieved an ATAR of 95+, placing them in the top 5% of the State
 5 students achieved an ATAR of 99+
 19.5% of study scores were 40+
 34 was the median study score

References

External links 
 Goulburn Valley Grammar School

Private secondary schools in Victoria (Australia)
Educational institutions established in 1982
1982 establishments in Australia